Alpine, Alabama may refer to:
Alpine, DeKalb County, Alabama, an unincorporated community in DeKalb County, Alabama
Alpine, Talladega County, Alabama, an unincorporated community in Talladega County, Alabama